Commodore Apartment Building may refer to:

 Commodore Apartment Building (Louisville, Kentucky), listed on the NRHP in Kentucky
 Commodore Apartment Building (Shaker Heights, Ohio), listed on the NRHP in Ohio